José Manuel López may refer to:
José Manuel López Rodríguez, Spanish cyclist
José Manuel López Gaspar, Spanish footballer
José Manuel López Rodrigo, Spanish activist and politician
José Manuel López Castro, vocalist and lead guitarist of Los Plebes del Rancho de Ariel Camacho
José Manuel López (footballer), Argentine footballer
Josesito López (José Manuel López), American boxer
José Manuel López, Spanish journalist, see Disappearance of Antonio Pampliega, José Manuel López and Ángel Sastre